Wagh is an ancient village located about 10 kilometers towards north of the camp of Alexander the Great on the bank of Jhelum River near Jalalpur Sharif, in Tehsil Pind Dadan Khan of District Jhelum in Pakistan. It is situated in a valley surrounded by foothills of Salt Range from northern, eastern and southern sides and a rain dependent river Nala Banha towards its west, nearly 45 kilometres towards East of Khewra Salt Mines and falls within the jurisdiction of the police station and Union Council at Jalalpur Sharif. Wagh is the largest village in Chamkon Valley. CHAMKOWN stands for Chanadh, Muradanwali, Khairr, Wagh and Nagial .

Means of communication
The village is connected with Jhelum - Pind Dadan Khan Road at Jalalpur Sharif through a 10 kilometers long road passing through the heights of Salt Range and valleys with great scenic beauty around. The road passes by the villages of Nagial, Muradan Wali and Chanadh, etc. The road supports the jeeps and light vehicles only. When the rainy season is off, the villagers also travel by jeeps and local buses passing through dry Nala Banha toward Pind Sawika wherefrom they touch the Pind Sawika - Darapur road which links with Jhelum - Pind Dadan Khan road at the village Darapur.

Livelihood
Majority of village dwellers in Wagh earn their livelihood through rain dependent arid agriculture and cattle grazing, etc. Almost 99 percent people prefer to get their children inducted in Armed forces of Pakistan after completion of their education.

Gallantry award
The village has produced soldiers who have participated in the First World War, Second World War, Indo-Pak War of 1965, Indo-Pak War of 1971 and Kargil War, war on terror. Brig (Retd) Muhammad Aslam Janjua, then Major, was conferred Sitara-e-Jurat, the third highest gallantry award of Pakistan Military, in Indo-Pak War of 1965 and his 2 times war injured grandson Maj Moaz Haider Janjua, then lieutenant, was awarded Imtiazi Sanad against his exceptional bravery in Second Battle of Swat.

Municipal services
A basic health unit was established in the village in 1988. The village was provided with electricity and land line telephone facility in 1992 whereafter water supply system was also provided.

Education
The following educational institutions are available:
 Government High School Wagh (for boys)
 Government Girls High School Wagh
 Al Hadi Foundation Wagh

See also
 Jhelum District
 Pind Dadan Khan
 Jalalpur Sharif
 Pind Sawika
 Sitara-e-Jurat

References

Jhelum District